Talay Sanguandikul (born 9 September 1995), also known as Lay, is a Thai actor. He is best known from the series My Engineer and YYY.

Biography 
Talay Sanguandikul was born on 9 September 1995. "Talay" means "the sea", and came from his father who owned the resort business at Koh Samed Thailand before. Talay's official hashtag is "Lay-Bok-Mai-Wan" (Thai:  เลบอกไม่หวาน), meaning "Lay said no sweet". It was announced on his twitter on 4th May 2020. His official Fanclub name is "Less Sweet Gang" (Thai: แก๊งหวานน้อย).

Education 
Talay graduated with the second honor in Bachelor's degree of Arts Program in Social Communication Innovation, Majoring in Interactive and Multimedia Design, from College of Social Communication Innovation, Srinakharinwirot University. He went to Saint Gabriel's College High school in Bangkok.

Work

Series

Music Video 

 The Devil - Stamp Apiwat
 ติดตลก - OAT Pramote
 ไม่เกี่ยวกับเธอ - New Jiew
 เธอไม่คิดอะไร - EASE
 ชาตินี้พอ - O-Pavee
 Why Destiny - Y-Destiny Cast
 มาไงคาใจ - Dif Kids X K.Aglet feat. K.Praewa
 ทฤษฎี - Inkformation
 รักไม่มีกฏเกณฑ์ - Ton Tanasit (Ost. The Series My Engineer)
 คนที่ฉันรอ - MOD3GxJOELONG (Ost. The Series My Engineer)
 If Only (หากวันนั้น) - ROOM39
 YYY - BALLCHON feat.Piggynoii (Ost. YYY The Series)
 ตัลลั๊ค - Talay x Yoon (Ost. YYY The Series)
 First Time Lonely (เหงาแหละ) - Talay Sanguandikul, Tommy Sittichok (BOYFRIENDS PROJECT)

Music 

 ตัลลั๊ค - Talay x Yoon (Ost. YYY The Series)
 First Time Lonely (เหงาแหละ) - Talay Sanguandikul, Tommy Sittichok (BOYFRIENDS PROJECT)

Concert 

 My Engineer 1st Fan Meeting "More Than Just My Engineer"
 BE MY BOYFRIENDS CONCERT (BOYFRIENDS PROJECT)

Advertisement 

 Mister Donut Line Friend
 Ice Cream Cornetto
 JULA'S HERB

Award 

|-
! rowspan="2" style="text-align:center;" | 2021
| Popular Award of Brightest Star
| rowspan="2" style="text-align:center;" | The Yniverse awards 2020
| rowspan="2" 
| rowspan="2" style="text-align:center;" | King - The Series My Engineer
| rowspan="2" style="text-align:center;" |
|-
| Excellent Award of Best Supporting Role

References

External links
 
 

1995 births
Living people
Talay Sanguandikul
Talay Sanguandikul